José Gerardo de los Cobos Silva (born 11 April 1962) is a Mexican politician from the National Action Party. He has served as a federal deputy of the LVI and LXI Legislatures of the Mexican Congress representing Guanajuato, as well as a local deputy in the Congress of Guanajuato.

References

1962 births
Living people
Politicians from Guanajuato
National Action Party (Mexico) politicians
20th-century Mexican politicians
21st-century Mexican politicians
Members of the Congress of Guanajuato
Deputies of the LXI Legislature of Mexico
Members of the Chamber of Deputies (Mexico) for Guanajuato